Anthony Pérez-Cortesia (born 29 September 1993) is a Venezuelan professional basketball player, who represented Venezuela at the 2016 Olympic Games in Rio de Janeiro.

College career
Pérez played college basketball at Ole Miss, with the Ole Miss Rebels, in the United States, where his head coach, Andy Kennedy, called him one of the "greatest mysteries" he's ever coached. This was based on his ability to sharp shoot on certain nights.

Professional career
Pérez began his pro career in 2016, with the Mexican League club Soles de Mexicali.

On 30 October 2020, Perez signed with Guaiqueríes de Margarita.

National team career
Pérez has been a member of the senior men's Venezuelan national basketball team. He played at the 2016 South American Championship, where he won a gold medal, and at the 2016 Olympic Games.

References

External links
FIBA Profile
Latinbasket.com Profile
2016 Olympics Profile
Ole Miss Rebels College Bio
ESPN.com College Stats

1993 births
Living people
Basketball players at the 2016 Summer Olympics
Basketball players at the 2019 Pan American Games
Ole Miss Rebels men's basketball players
Olympic basketball players of Venezuela
People from Sucre
Power forwards (basketball)
Small forwards
Soles de Mexicali players
Trotamundos B.B.C. players
Venezuelan expatriate basketball people in Mexico
Venezuelan expatriate basketball people in the United States
Venezuelan men's basketball players
2019 FIBA Basketball World Cup players
Pan American Games competitors for Venezuela
People from Sucre (state)